Edmond Lévy (born 1934) is a French classical historian.

Biography

Originally a pupil of an École normale supérieure (promotion 1956), an aggregate of letters, he was also a pupil of École française d'Athènes, a school in Athens, Greece where the French language is taught to students who are mainly from France.  He is a specialist in Greek history and is a retired professor at Marc-Bloch University in Strasbourg, France.  He edits the Ktèma review.

Works

 Athènes devant la défaite de 404. Histoire d'une crise idéologique, De Boccard, 1976
 La femme dans les sociétés antiques, University of Strasbourg, 1983
 Le système palatial en Orient, en Grèce et à Rome, De Boccard, 1987
 La Grèce au Ve siècle, de Clisthène à Socrate, Seuil, 1995
 La codification des lois dans l'Antiquité, De Boccard, 2000
 Sparte. Histoire politique et sociale jusqu'à la conquête romaine, Seuil, 2003

External links
In French:
https://web.archive.org/web/20051014161612/http://www.umr7044.cnrs.fr/ANNUAIRE/titulaires/EdmondLevy.html
https://web.archive.org/web/20060322095917/http://www.fnac.com/199331/rcwwwa/La-Grece-au-Veme-siecle-De-Clisthene-a-Socrate-Nouvelle-histoire-de-l-Antiquite

20th-century French historians
Historians of antiquity
1934 births
Living people
École Normale Supérieure alumni
Members of the French School at Athens